Goedde or Gödde is a surname. Notable people with the surname include:

John Goedde (born 1949), American politician
Stefan Gödde (born 1975), German television presenter
Steve Diet Goedde (born 1965), American fetish photographer

German-language surnames
Surnames from given names